In the 1990 Intertoto Cup no knock-out rounds were contested, and therefore no winner was declared.

Teams

  Sturm Graz
  Tirol Innsbruck
  Vienna
  Admira Wacker Wien
  Pirin Blagoevgrad
  Slavia Sofia
  Slovan Bratislava
  Sparta Prague 
  Bohemians Prague 
  Plastika Nitra
  Lyngby BK 
  Vejle BK
  Brøndby
  AGF Aarhus
  OB
  Energie Cottbus 
  Hansa Rostock
  Chemnitz
  FC Berlin
  Bochum 
  Bayer Uerdingen
  Kaiserslautern
  Karlsruhe
  Fortuna Düsseldorf
  Siófok
  MTK Budapest
  Tatabánya
  Vasas
  Maccabi Haifa
  Bnei Yehuda
  Lech Poznań
  Petrolul Ploiești
  Sportul București 
  Malmö FF
  GAIS
  IFK Norrköping 
  Örebro
  Gefle IF
  Neuchâtel Xamax
  St. Gallen
  FC Luzern
  Grasshopper Club
  Olimpija Ljubljana 
  Osijek

Group stage
The teams were divided into 11 groups of 4 teams each.

Group 1

Group 2

Group 3

Group 4

Group 5

Group 6

Group 7

Group 8

Group 9

Group 10

Group 11

See also
 1990–91 European Cup
 1990–91 European Cup Winners' Cup
 1990–91 UEFA Cup

External links
  by Pawel Mogielnicki

1990
4